Andrej Martin and Gerald Melzer were the defending champions, but Martin chose not to participate. Melzer partnered with Yannick Mertens instead and lost in the first round.

Ruben Gonzales and Darren Walsh won the title, defeating Emilio Gómez and Roberto Maytín in the final, 4–6, 6–3, [12–10].

Seeds

Draw

References
 Main Draw

Morelos Open - Doubles